Stange Station is located in Stange, Norway on the Dovre Line. The station was opened in 1880 with the construction of the railway between Eidsvoll and Hamar. Stange is only served by regional trains by Vy.

In 1999 the station was almost closed by the Norwegian Railway Inspectorate who required the Norwegian National Rail Administration to rebuild one of the platforms, removing a small one between track one and two, and putting in a broader one between track two and three.

External links 
</

Railway stations on the Dovre Line
Railway stations in Hedmark
Railway stations opened in 1880
1880 establishments in Norway